The minister of Finance, originally known as colonial treasurer, is a minister and the head of the New Zealand Treasury, responsible for producing an annual New Zealand budget outlining the government's proposed expenditure. The position is often considered to be the most important cabinet post after that of the prime minister.

The current Minister of Finance is Grant Robertson. There are also three associate minister roles; they are currently held by David Parker, Megan Woods, and Michael Wood.

Responsibilities and powers

One of the Minister of Finance's key roles involves the framing of the annual year budget. According to Parliament's Standing Orders, the Minister of Finance may veto any parliamentary bill which would have a significant impact on the government's budget plans. The Minister of Finance supervises the Treasury, which is the government's primary advisor on matters of economic and financial policy. As such, the Minister of Finance has broad control of the government's spending, making the position quite powerful.

Some analysts, such as Jonathan Boston, claim that the Minister of Finance can sometimes hold more influence than the Prime Minister, if the conditions are right. Gordon Coates, Finance Minister in the early 1930s, was sometimes such a figure. Some political scientists, such as Boston, believe that in the government of David Lange, Minister of Finance Roger Douglas held more power than was proper, and that the Treasury was using its control of government finances to take a supervisory role across the whole administration. It was probably for this reason that Lange's successor, Geoffrey Palmer, established the Department of the Prime Minister and Cabinet, which could offer the Prime Minister advice independent of that given by individual ministers.

History
The office of Minister of Finance has existed since 1841. Apart from the office of Prime Minister itself, the only other cabinet posts to have existed since the first cabinet are those of Attorney-General and Minister of Internal Affairs. Originally, the holder of the post was designated "Colonial Treasurer", but this term was replaced with "Minister of Finance" shortly after New Zealand ceased to be a Colony and became a Dominion. This occurred in 1907, during the cabinet of Joseph Ward.

In the past, several Prime Ministers took on the post of Minister of Finance themselves, though in recent times this practice has declined. Robert Muldoon, the last person to concurrently serve as Prime Minister and Minister of Finance, created considerable controversy by doing so. It is more common, however, for a Deputy Prime Minister to serve as Minister of Finance. Bob Tizard, Michael Cullen, Bill English and Grant Robertson served as Deputy Prime Minister when in the position as Minister of Finance.

Traditionally Ministers of Finance rank second or third in seniority lists within Westminster-style Cabinets, although initially Harry Lake was ranked at sixth and his successor Robert Muldoon was ranked at eighth; both because of their short service to date in Parliament, and because Keith Holyoake saw Muldoon as too arrogant and ambitious for his own good.

The convention of making a second, more junior appointment in the Finance portfolio began with Holyoake, who appointed Muldoon as an Assistant Minister to Lake shortly before the latter's death in 1967. Some successive Prime Ministers made similar appointments of an Associate Minister of Finance (for example, Marshall and Kirk) but this was not always done (Rowling, for example, who had Mick Connelly as his associate while serving as Finance Minister did not appoint an associate Minister after succeeding to the premiership in 1974). Associate appointments became standard when Muldoon served concurrently as both Prime Minister and Finance Minister. In his second term, Muldoon appointed both a Deputy Minister of Finance (Hugh Templeton) as well as an associate Minister (Derek Quigley). Muldoon's successors Lange and Palmer continued to have a three-strong Finance team, each appointing two associate Ministers to support their respective Ministers of Finance. At times, the appointment of associate Ministers was intended to temper the reform ambitions of Roger Douglas.

In the coalition governments formed in 1996 and 2017, responsibility for Finance was shared between the parties. After the 1996 elections, the role of the Minister of Finance was formally split between two portfolios – that of Minister of Finance and that of Treasurer. The position of Treasurer was senior to that of the Minister of Finance, and was created as part of the coalition agreement between the National Party and New Zealand First. It was established especially for Winston Peters, leader of New Zealand First, who demanded it as part of the deal. When Peters ended the coalition, the position reverted to the National Party. After the change of government in 1999, both positions were held concurrently by Michael Cullen before they were combined into the old Minister of Finance portfolio in 2002. Both New Zealand First and the Green Party won an associate Finance role in the negotiations that formed the Sixth Labour Government.

List of Finance Ministers
Key

List of Treasurers
Key

References

External links

New Zealand Treasury

Finance
1841 establishments in New Zealand
Government finances in New Zealand